LS-DYNA is an advanced general-purpose multiphysics simulation software package developed by the former Livermore Software Technology Corporation (LSTC), which was acquired by Ansys in 2019. While the package continues to contain more and more possibilities for the calculation of many complex, real world problems, its origins and core-competency lie in highly nonlinear transient dynamic finite element analysis (FEA) using explicit time integration. LS-DYNA is used by the automobile, aerospace, construction and civil engineering, military, manufacturing, and bioengineering industries.

History 

LS-DYNA originated from the 3D FEA program DYNA3D, developed by Dr. John O. Hallquist at Lawrence Livermore National Laboratory (LLNL) in 1976. DYNA3D was created in order to simulate the impact of the Full Fuzing Option (FUFO) or "Dial-a-yield" nuclear bomb for low altitude release (impact velocity of ~ 40 m/s). At the time, no 3D software was available for simulating impact, and 2D software was inadequate. Though the FUFO bomb was eventually canceled, development of DYNA3D continued. DYNA3D used explicit time integration to study nonlinear dynamic problems, with the original applications being mostly stress analysis of structures undergoing various types of impacts. The program was initially very simple largely due to the lack of adequate computational resources at the time. A two-dimensional version of the same software was developed concurrently. In 1978 the DYNA3D source code was released into the public domain without restrictions after a request from France.

In 1979 a new version of DYNA3D was released which was programmed for optimal performance on the CRAY-1 supercomputers. This new release contained improved sliding interface treatment which was an order of magnitude faster than the previous contact treatment. This version also eliminated structural and higher order solid elements of the first version, while including element-wise integration of the integral difference method developed in 1974.

The 1982 release included nine additional material models which allowed for new simulations, such as explosive-structure and soil-structure interactions. The release also permitted the analysis of structural response due to penetrating projectiles. Improvements in 1982 further boosted the execution speed by about 10 percent. Hallquist was the sole developer of DYNA3D until 1984, when he was joined by Dr. David J. Benson. In 1986, many capabilities were added. The added features included beams, shells, rigid bodies, single surface contact, interface friction, discrete springs and dampers, optional hourglass treatments, optional exact volume integration, and VAX/VMS, IBM, UNIX, COS operating system compatibility. At this point, DYNA3D became the first code to have a general single surface contact algorithm.

Metal forming simulation and composite analysis capabilities were added to DYNA3D in 1987. This version included changes to the shell elements, and dynamic relaxation. The final release of DYNA3D in 1988 included several more elements and capabilities.

By 1988 LLNL had sent approximately 600 tapes containing simulation software. Hallquist had consulted for nearly 60 companies and organizations on the use of DYNA3D. As a result, at the end of 1988 Livermore Software Technology Corporation (LSTC) was founded to continue the development of DYNA3D in a much more focused manner, resulting in LS-DYNA3D (later shortened to LS-DYNA). Releases and support for DYNA3D were thus halted. Since then, LSTC has greatly expanded the capabilities of LS-DYNA in an attempt to create a universal tool for most simulation needs.

In 2019, LSTC was acquired by  Ansys, Inc.

Typical uses 

Nonlinear means at least one (and sometimes all) of the following complications:
 Changing boundary conditions (such as contact between parts that changes over time)
 Large deformations (for example the crumpling of sheet metal parts)
 Nonlinear materials that do not exhibit ideally elastic behavior (for example thermoplastic polymers)

Transient dynamic means analyzing high speed, short duration events where inertial forces are important. Typical uses include:
 Automotive crash (deformation of chassis, airbag inflation, seatbelt tensioning, ...)
 Explosions (underwater mines, shaped charges, ...)
 Manufacturing (sheet metal stamping, ...)

Characteristics 

LS-DYNA consists of a single executable file and is entirely command-line driven. Therefore, all that is required to run LS-DYNA is a command shell, the executable, an input file, and enough free disk space to run the calculation. All input files are in simple ASCII format and thus can be prepared using any text editor. Input files can also be prepared with the aid of a graphical preprocessor. There are many third-party software products available for preprocessing LS-DYNA input files. LSTC also develops its own preprocessor, LS-PrePost, which is freely distributed and runs without a license. Licensees of LS-DYNA automatically have access to all of the program's capabilities, from simple linear static mechanical analysis up to advanced thermal and flow solving methods. Furthermore, they have full use of LSTC's LS-OPT software, a standalone design optimization and probabilistic analysis package with an interface to LS-DYNA.

Capabilities 

LS-DYNA's potential applications are numerous and can be tailored to many fields. LS-DYNA is not limited to any particular type of simulation. In a given simulation, any of LS-DYNA's many features can be combined to model a wide variety of physical events. An example of a simulation that involves a unique combination of features is the NASA JPL Mars Pathfinder landing which simulated the space probe's use of airbags to aid in its landing.

LS-DYNA's analysis capabilities:
 Full 2D & 3D capabilities
 Nonlinear dynamics
 Rigid body dynamics
 Quasi-static simulations
 Normal modes
 Linear statics
 Thermal analysis
 Fluid analysis
 Eulerian capabilities
 ALE (Arbitrary Lagrangian-Eulerian)
 FSI (Fluid-Structure Interaction)
 Navier-Stokes fluids
 Compressible fluid solver, CESE (Conservation Element & Solution Element)
 FEM-rigid multi-body dynamics coupling (MADYMO, Cal3D)
 Underwater shock
 Failure analysis
 Crack propagation
 Real-time acoustics
 Implicit springback
 Multi-physics coupling
 Structural-thermal coupling
 Adaptive remeshing
 SPH (Smoothed particle hydrodynamics)
 DEM (Discrete element method)
 EFG (Element Free Galerkin)
 Radiation transport
 EM (Electromagnetism)

Material Library 

LS-DYNA's comprehensive library of material models:

 Metals
 Plastics
 Glass
 Foams
 Fabrics
 Elastomers
 Honeycombs
 Concrete & soils
 Viscous fluids
 User-defined materials

Element Library 

Some of the element types available in LS-DYNA:

 Beams (standard, trusses, discrete, cables, and welds) (with over 10 beam element formulations)
 Discrete Elements (Springs and Dampers)
 Lumped Inertias
 Lumped Masses
 Accelerometers
 Sensors
 Seat Belts
 Pretensioners
 Retractors
 Sliprings
 Shells (3, 4, 6, and 8-node including 3D shells, membranes, 2D plane stress, plane strain, and axisymmetric solids) (with over 25 shell element formulations)
 Solids (4 and 10-node tetrahedrons, 6-node pentahedrons, and 8-node hexahedrons) (with over 20 solid element formulations)
 SPH Elements
 Thick Shells (8-node)

Contact Algorithms 

LS-DYNA's contact algorithms:

 Flexible body contact
 Flexible body to rigid body contact
 Rigid body to rigid body contact
 Edge-to-edge contact
 Eroding contact
 Tied surfaces
 CAD surfaces
 Rigid walls
 Draw beads

Applications

Automotive crashworthiness & occupant safety 

LS-DYNA is used by the automotive industry to analyze vehicle designs. LS-DYNA accurately predicts a car's behavior in a collision and the effects of the collision upon the car's occupants. With LS-DYNA, automotive companies and their suppliers can test car designs without having to tool or experimentally test a prototype, thus saving time and expense.

LS-DYNA's specialized automotive features:

 Seatbelts
 Slip rings
 Pretensioners
 Retractors
 Sensors
 Accelerometers
 Airbags
 Hybrid III dummy models
 Inflator models

Sheetmetal forming with LS-DYNA 

One of LS-DYNA's applications is sheetmetal forming. LS-DYNA accurately predicts the stresses and deformations experienced by the metal, and determines if the metal will fail. LS-DYNA supports adaptive remeshing and will refine the mesh during the analysis, as necessary, to increase accuracy and save time.

Metal forming applications for LS-DYNA include:

 Metal stamping
 Hydroforming
 Forging
 Deep drawing
 Multi-stage processes

Aerospace industry applications 

LS-DYNA is used by the aerospace industry to simulate bird strike, jet engine blade containment, and structural failure.

Aerospace applications for LS-DYNA include:

 Blade containment
 Bird strike (windshield, and engine blade)
 Failure analysis

Military and defense applications 
	
LS-DYNA is used extensively by researchers from military and defense. Some of these applications include:

 Explosions (underwater Naval mine, shaped charges)
 Projectile Penetration
 Rail Gun
 Warhead Design
 Shockwave modelling

Oil and gas industry 

LS-DYNA is used in oil and gas industries to perform fatigue analysis on offshore structures, failure analysis of ships under the event of collision, and simulate fluid structure interactions. LS-DYNA applications for oil and gas industry include:

 Jacket Platform Analysis
 Sloshing Analysis
 Ice Impact
 Wave and Tsunami Impact

Other applications 

Other LS-DYNA applications include:

 Drop testing
 Can and shipping container design
 Electronic component design
 Glass forming
 Plastics, mold, and blow forming
 Biomedical (heart valves)
 Metal cutting
 Earthquake engineering
 Failure analysis
 Sports equipment (golf clubs, golf balls, baseball bats, helmets)
 Civil engineering (offshore platforms, pavement design)

References

External links
 LSTC Company Website
 Papers from European and International LS-DYNA User Conferences
 Examples and Class Notes for Download
 Training and Class Notes for Download
 Download for Windows

Finite element software
Finite element software for Linux
Public-domain software with source code